Liberty County Airport  is a county-owned airport a mile west of Chester, in Liberty County, Montana.

Most U.S. airports use the same three-letter location identifier for the FAA and IATA, but this airport is LTY to the FAA and has no IATA code.

Facilities
In the year ending August 24, 2008 the airport had 4,700 general aviation aircraft operations, average 12 per day.

References

External links 
 

Airports in Montana
Buildings and structures in Liberty County, Montana
Transportation in Liberty County, Montana